is a terminal funicular railway station on the Hakone Tozan Cable Car Line in the town of Hakone, Ashigarashimo District, Kanagawa Prefecture, Japan.

History
Sōunzan Station opened on December 1, 1921 with the opening of the Hakone Tozan Cable Car Line.

Lines
Hakone Tozan Cable Car
Hakone Ropeway

Layout
Sōunzan Station on the Hakone Tozan Cable Car has a bay platform serving one track. The station is elevated to incorporate the cable winding equipment necessary for the operation of funicular railway and the cable car.
The boarding area for the Hakone Cable Car is on the second floor, with access by stairs or by elevator, as the station is built barrier free for use by handicapped customers.

Bus services
Izuhakone Bus  Bus Stop 
"J" line for Hakone-en (Lake Ashi) via Ōwakudani, Kojiri
"J" line for Odawara Station via Kowaki-en, Kowakidani Station, Miyanoshita, Hakone-Yumoto Station

References

External links
Hakone Tozan Railway
Hakone Ropeway
Location map 

Railway stations in Kanagawa Prefecture
Railway stations in Japan opened in 1921
Buildings and structures in Hakone, Kanagawa